Prestes Maia may refer to:

 Francisco Prestes Maia, urban planner and mayor of São Paulo
 Prestes Maia (building), a highrise squat in downtown São Paulo